Paraxenisthmus cerberusi is a species of fish in the genus Paraxenisthmus of the Xenisthmidae (wriggler) family, which is regarded as a synonymous with the Eleotridae, from Palau and Fiji in the West Pacific. Its specific name refers to Cerberus, the three-headed dog which guards the entrance to Hades in Greek mythology, given to this species because of its relatively large number of teeth and in reference to the black juveniles and the red and black adults, the colours of which are associated with Hell in Christianity. This small fish was found in a drop-off which had caves and ledges with shelves and slopes covered in silt and sand. The area had growths of hydroids, sea fans, a range of hard corals and some Halimeda.

References

Eleotridae
Fish described in 2006